William Cato Cramer Sr. (August 4, 1922 – October 18, 2003), was an American attorney and politician, elected in 1954 as a member of the United States House of Representatives from St. Petersburg, Florida. He was the first Florida Republican elected to Congress since 1880, shortly after the end of Reconstruction. He was re-elected, serving without interruption until 1970.

In Congress, Cramer became a ranking member of the Roads subcommittee of the Committee on Public Works, and influenced national highway policy at a time of major expansion, ensuring that Interstates were kept toll-free. He gained extra funding to link Tampa and Miami, in a federal interstate project built in Florida.

He was instrumental in the revival of the Republican Party in Florida through the mid-20th century, taking advantage of the state's changing demographics and new Republican migrants from the Northern United States and the Midwestern United States, and attracting Cuban Americans and other minorities to the party. Beginning in 1964, Cramer represented the state for 20 years on the Republican National Committee and served as its counsel for six years.

The long absence of Republican officials from state office and weakened condition of the party were due to suppression of black and Republican voting in the 19th century, and the disenfranchisement of African Americans at the turn of the century, as they had constituted the majority of the Republican Party. Most were not able to vote for decades. They re-entered the political system by gaining the power to vote after passage of the federal Voting Rights Act of 1965.

Background

Cramer was born in Denver, Colorado; when he was three years old, his parents relocated the family to St. Petersburg, Florida. Located on the Gulf Coast in Pinellas County, in the early 21st century it has become the fourth-largest city in the state. Cramer attended the public segregated schools and graduated from St. Petersburg High School, where he waged his first political campaigns by running for student government. He attended St. Petersburg Junior College, the first public community college in Florida. Cramer grew up with a strong work ethic: as a teenager, he worked a variety of jobs. Before entering the University of North Carolina at Chapel Hill to complete a 4-year degree, he worked as a bellhop at a resort hotel in North Carolina.

In 1943, Cramer enlisted in the United States Navy. With his degree, he was commissioned as a gunnery officer and fought to liberate France during World War II. After the war, he served in the United States Naval Reserve until 1946. That same year, Cramer graduated Phi Beta Kappa from the University of North Carolina. In 1948, he graduated from Harvard Law School in Cambridge, Massachusetts, and returned to St. Petersburg. He entered the private practice of law.

As part of getting established, Cramer married Alice of Dothan, Alabama. They had three children together before divorcing decades later.

In 1949, Cramer switched his partisan affiliation from Democratic to Republican at the urging of his law partner, Herman Goldner. He later was elected as mayor of St. Petersburg. At the time, statewide voter registration in Florida was some fourteen-to-one Democratic, largely because of disenfranchisement of African Americans as voters since the turn of the century by discriminatory application of the state constitution and subsequent laws. They had comprised the majority of the Republican Party at that time. The party was hollowed out in the state and across the South, as all the other states also achieved disenfranchisement of African Americans, which withstood early court challenges.

Florida political divisions

Florida had an uneven population distribution and unusual shape. Democratic factions lost dominance of the Pinellas County area as state demographics changed. The state attracted new migrants from the North and its urbanization also resulted in change: urbanites have been unwilling to accept domination by a few party leaders. V.O. Key, Jr., the political scientist, described Florida elections in the years prior to these changes as "personality-oriented within narrow ideological boundaries." In the one-party Democratic state, competitive races occurred only in the primaries.

In the 1940s and 1950s, new Republicans settled in the state, mostly white migrants, often retirees, from the American Midwest or the northeastern states. They challenged Democratic domination in Pinellas County and other locations known for their concentration of retirees.

The migration of such business executives and senior citizens began to change the partisan profile of the Pinellas County area, and other popular destinations, such as Miami on the Atlantic coast. In 1928, Republican presidential nominee Herbert C. Hoover helped to carry Pinellas County Republicans to victory in county races for sheriff, county judge, assessor, and for state senator. In 1948, Republican Thomas E. Dewey won Pinellas, Sarasota, Palm Beach, Broward, and Orange counties and a third of the statewide vote.

Shifts in the larger state were reflected in presidential voting in 1952 and 1956, when the ticket of Eisenhower-Nixon carried the state. In 1960, 1968, and 1972, Nixon prevailed in Florida as the presidential nominee, attracting votes from many who still voted Democratic for local and state positions. Following passage of the Voting Rights Act of 1965, which provided for federal enforcement of rights, African Americans were able to register and vote again.and did so in increasing numbers. They generally affiliated with the national Democratic Party. Texan Democrat Lyndon B. Johnson won the state in 1964, as did Jimmy Carter of neighboring Georgia in 1976. Carter also gained votes as a Southern favorite son, and attracted blue-collar and historically Democratic voters, and African Americans.

State legislative service

In 1950, Cramer ran for the Florida House of Representatives. He was also the campaign manager for the Pinellas County Republican slate, none of whose fourteen members had previously sought office. The Republicans decried inefficient government and "boss-type" politics, organized the grassroots, and offered a unified ticket. All but one of the GOP candidates were elected. Cramer became the de facto "titular head" of the Pinellas County party. Nearly a quarter century later, in 1974 the Florida Republican State Executive Committee honored Cramer as Florida's "Mr. Republican," a designation once given at the national level to U.S. Senator Robert A. Taft of Ohio. In 1967, the Tampa Tribune humorously paraphrased the biblical Book of John to emphasize Cramer's role in the state GOP: "In the beginning there was the party, and the party was with Bill Cramer, and the party was Bill Cramer."

When Cramer's two Republican legislative colleagues in 1951 named him minority leader, the Democrats teased them for "caucusing in a phone booth." Because the Florida legislature operates under the rules of the United States House of Representatives, Cramer was able to assert political "minority rights;" he raised his personal and the party visibility in state politics. In the state House, Cramer defended junior colleges from challenges waged by the four-year institutions. Having attended a two-year institution, Cramer considered junior colleges essential to lower-cost educational opportunities for state residents. Cramer worked to establish the state's first anti-crime commission, but the Democrats refused to name any Republicans to the panel.

Run for Congress

In 1952, Cramer ran for a seat in the U.S. House against Courtney W. Campbell, a Democratic businessman from Clearwater and a former member of the state highway board. There was no incumbent in the race, so it was open. Having spent $25,000 in a handshaking tour of Pinellas, Hillsborough, Pasco, and Hernando counties, Cramer benefited from the national Eisenhower-Nixon ticket but lost by 0.7 percent. He was appointed as the Pinellas County attorney, serving for two years.

In 1954, with a stronger organization, Cramer ran again and unseated Campbell by the same 0.7 percent margin by which he had lost in 1952. Cramer found that the $40,000 he spent in 1954 was insufficient for advertising in the still new medium of television, but the state party had contributed several thousand dollars to his campaign.

Tenure

U.S. Representative Robert L. F. Sikes of Crestview depicted his fellow Democrat Courtney Campbell as "hard-working, dedicated, and capable" but ineffective in public speaking. He noted, "Cramer was articulate, a successful lawyer, and he already enjoyed some recognition in public life. In my effort to help Campbell, I said that Cramer, serving in a Democratic Congress, would be like a lost ball in high weeds. Bill never let me forget that statement, although subsequently we became good friends."

Cramer represented Florida's 1st congressional district from 1955 to 1963. Reapportionment placed him in the 12th district from 1963 to 1967. Another reapportionment assigned him to the 8th district for his final two terms in office, 1967 to 1971.

Civil rights
Cramer had a mixed record on civil rights during his time in congress. In 1957, Cramer joined four other southern Republican House colleagues, including Bruce Alger of Texas and Joel T. Broyhill of Virginia, in seeking a conference with President Eisenhower to discuss the Little Rock Integration Crisis. They wanted to persuade the president to remove federal troops that he had sent there to maintain order, but Eisenhower kept troops in the city for the remainder of the 1957-1958 school year. Despite this, Cramer had been one of the few Southern Congressmen not to sign the 1956 anti-desegregation Southern Manifesto. Cramer voted in favor of the Voting Rights Act of 1965 and Civil Rights Act of 1968. These contrasted with Cramer’s earlier votes against the Civil Rights Acts of 1957, 1960, and 1964. Cramer did not vote on the 24th Amendment to the U.S. Constitution.

In time, Cramer became the ranking minority member on the then-named House Public Works Committee. He was a ranking member of the Roads subcommittee and was influential in federal highway policy at a time of extensive expansion of federal investment. Cramer addressed corruption in highway politics, worked to keep Interstates toll-free, and ensured that highway funds were kept to invest in roads. He battled proponents of the Sunshine State Parkway in Florida. As it was constructed parallel to designated Interstate routes, it threatened to draw off traffic and make the highways unfeasible.  Using his influence on a federal project in the state, Cramer secured funding for the additional mileage to provide a link between Tampa Bay and Miami. It had not been authorized in the original federal project and funding. This route passed through St. Petersburg so he got his hometown covered.

Cramer was also vice chairman of the House Republican Conference, which became more influential as representation increased from southern states.

Republican National Committee

In 1964, after nine years in the House, Cramer was elected to the Republican National Committee, a position that he held for 20 consecutive years, including 14 years after he left Congress. In 1964, he also headed the presidential delegate slate pledged to U.S. Senator Barry M. Goldwater of Arizona. Cramer said that Goldwater asked him to circumvent the party "regulars" led by Harold Alexander and Tom Brown of Tampa because the state leadership had been too passive in trying to develop the party. The Republican primary was competitive, but the "regulars" narrowly won over Cramer and his insurgents.

Cramer was a delegate or alternate delegate to each Republican National Convention from 1952 to 1984. As a 20-year RNC member, he also served as the committee's general counsel for six years.

Edward Gurney was a transplanted New Englander who settled in Winter Park. He was elected as a Republican to the U.S. House in 1962. He initially joined Cramer and the insurgents during the primaries but then withdrew his backing. The Brown regular forces narrowly won the primary in 1964. Cramer said that the insurgents might have won if Goldwater had continued to back them.

Dispute with Kirk

In Florida, 1964 was the year when a Republican candidate for U.S. Senator polled 36.1% in the general election, another sign of changing politics. It was a strong showing for relative newcomer Claude R. Kirk, Jr., a Democrat-turned-Republican from California, as he ran against veteran Democratic U.S. Senator Spessard Holland, a former governor and head of the Florida Democratic establishment. Trying to build up recognition and support, Kirk appealed to Cramer to address meetings held during the delegate and national committeeman races, and thus became acquainted with Republican party activists.

In 1966, Kirk returned for another campaign and scored a huge upset to become governor, defeating Democrat Miami Mayor Robert King High. Kirk won majorities in 56 of the 67  counties. During this campaign, a schism developed between Cramer and Kirk. Years later, in a 1988 interview, Kirk said that Cramer had not given him any assistance in either the 1964 or 1966 campaigns. He thought it was because Cramer wanted the gubernatorial nomination. The two men offered conflicting interpretations of these times.

Cramer said that he urged Kirk to merge his gubernatorial campaign in Pinellas County with the regular Republican party organization. But, Kirk organized a separate entity in order to maximize crossover support from Democrats unhappy with the nomination of Mayor High. Cramer recalled this disagreement over strategy as the "first indication that Kirk intended to do his own thing and attempt to form his own organization within the Republican Party in Florida. I didn't get the signal at the time, but it became very obvious later, particularly when he attempted to defeat me as national committeeman in 1968."

Despite Cramer's aid, Kirk overlooked him when planning his inauguration. He asked U.S. Representative Edward Gurney to serve as chairman of the inauguration, although Gurney had played no role in Kirk's campaign. In 1968, Governor Kirk dispatched his staff to the Republican state convention in Orlando to push for Cramer's ouster as national committeeman. As governor, he believed he was leader of the party and wanted his own man representing the state to the national committee. Cramer said, "I was about the only person at the time who stood in his way from taking total control."

Cramer believed he had earned the loyalty of the state's organizational Republicans: "I had proved myself an effective congressman. I was on the House leadership as vice chairman of the Republican Conference and was ranking member on the House Public Works Committee."

1968 Senate election

In 1968 three-term US Representative Edward Gurney sought the Florida U.S. Senate seat vacated by the retirement of Democrat George Smathers. Former Governor LeRoy Collins, an ally of retiring President Lyndon B. Johnson, was the Democratic nominee. Cramer and Gurney were prospective primary opponents until Cramer yielded to Gurney. They based this on an understanding that Gurney would thereafter back Cramer for the other Senate seat, which was expected to be vacated by Spessard Holland in 1970. According to Cramer, Gurney "pledged his support to me, and I did to him, and we shook hands."

Cramer's former law partner Herman Goldner, former mayor of Saint Petersburg, opposed Gurney in the primary but received few votes. Gurney defeated Democrat Collins for the US Senate in the general election, having carried all but four counties. Gurney and Cramer crisscrossed the state to work on building the Republican Party.

Cramer and Gurney had worked well as colleagues but were not friends. Kirk named Gurney's Orlando law firm as the counsel for the Florida Turnpike Authority, at a $100,000 annual retainer. Cramer's law firm received no state business.

1970 Senate election
In the fall of 1969, Cramer declared his candidacy for the Senate; Holland announced his retirement as expected. President Nixon encouraged Cramer's candidacy in 1970: "Bill, the Senate needs you, the country needs you, the people need you–now run."

In April 1970 the Senate rejected Judge G. Harrold Carswell of Tallahassee as Nixon's second consecutive conservative nominee to the United States Supreme Court. He had been newly appointed to the United States Court of Appeals for the Fifth Circuit, based in New Orleans, but his federal judicial service began under Eisenhower. Gurney and Holland, both Carswell supporters, were dismayed by his rejection.

Expecting to benefit over the uproar in Florida over the rejection of Judge Carswell, political aides suggested that Carswell resign from the bench and run for Holland's Senate seat. Gurney claimed that he was unaware that Cramer had considered running for the Senate in 1968 and had deferred to Gurney, with the expectation that Cramer would run for the other Senate seat in 1970. Governor Kirk and Gurney endorsed Carswell, and Lieutenant Governor Ray C. Osborne, a Kirk ally from St. Petersburg, abandoned his own challenge to Cramer. Years later, Kirk said that he "should have stuck with Osborne," and not encouraged Carswell to run. Kirk said that he had not "created" Carswell's candidacy, as often depicted by the media.  Carswell said that he had no knowledge of a "gentlemen's agreement" between Gurney and Cramer and that he had considered running for the Senate even before he was nominated to the Supreme Court. In 1970 Carswell said that his failure to be confirmed to the Court was because of the "dark evil winds of liberalism" and the "northern press and its knee-jerking followers in the Senate."

President Nixon did not voice support for either candidate during the Carswell-Cramer primary contest. Deputy Press Secretary Gerald Lee Warren said that Nixon had "no knowledge and no involvement" in Carswell's candidacy. Carswell secured endorsements from nationally known actors John Wayne and Gene Autry, and retained Richard Viguerie, the direct mail specialist from Falls Church, Virginia, to raise funds.

Cramer gave up his House seat to run for the Senate. His former district assistant Charles William "Bill" Young of St. Petersburg, then the Florida Senate minority leader, ran to succeed Cramer and won. Young was continuously re-elected to the seat until his death on October 18, 2013. At the time of his death, Young was the longest-serving Republican member of Congress. The congressional district, whose number varied over the years, remained Republican until the 2016 election.

In the primary campaign, Cramer stressed his amendment to the Civil Rights Act of 1964 to prohibit forced busing to achieve racial balance in public schools. He raised questions about Carswell's concurrence in two Fifth Circuit busing edicts. At first, Carswell ignored Cramer's charges; then he spoke out against busing."

A reporter from the Miami Herald compared Carswell's speeches to "legal opinions" aimed more at Senators Edward M. Kennedy of Massachusetts and Birch Bayh of Indiana, who had worked against his confirmation, than to Florida Republican primary voters. As a circuit judge, Carswell was bound by high court precedent, and after 1968, the federal courts had decreed busing as a tool to pursue racial balance in schools.

Like Cramer, Kirk was identified with anti-busing forces. He had been unable, in 1970, to halt a desegregation plan in Manatee County. At a time of cultural change and social unrest, Cramer went beyond the busing issue in his speeches to attack "cop killers, bombers, burners, and racial revolutionaries who would destroy America."

Cramer said that he had had a friendly acquaintance with Carswell prior to the 1970 campaign, but he later viewed the jurist as "a pawn" of kingmakers Kirk and Gurney. Cramer attributed his Senate nomination to his grassroots support and Carswell's lack of campaign experience. Carswell, however, claimed that his support among Democrats would have been considerable had Florida, like Alabama and Georgia, used an open primary.

In the Republican primary held on September 8, 1970, Cramer polled 220,553 votes to Carswell's 121,281. A third candidate, businessman George Balmer, received 10,974 votes. Senate Republican Leader Hugh Scott of Pennsylvania, who opposed Carswell's confirmation to the Supreme Court, said that Carswell "was asking for it, and he got what he deserved."

Florida gubernatorial election

The Republican Party primary for the governorship had a challenge to incumbent governor Kirk waged by Jack Eckerd. A Pennsylvania native and businessman, Eckerd had relocated to Florida after World War II where he operated and expanded a large chain of drugstores. Eckerd warned that the renomination of Kirk would produce a Republican fiasco in the fall campaign. In a primary endorsement, the Miami Herald depicted Eckerd as "an efficient campaigner with the ability to bring people together constructively ... [Eckerd has] a common touch, dedication to high principle, and organizing genius." Though he voted in the primary for Eckerd, Cramer took no public position.

Also in the gubernatorial Republican primary race was state senator L. A. "Skip" Bafalis of Palm Beach, later a U.S. representative. Kirk received 172,888 primary ballots, but Bafalis's 48,378 votes were sufficient to require a runoff with Eckerd, who received 137,731. Kirk prevailed in the runoff, 199,943 to Eckerd's 152,327, after he obtained Bafalis' reluctant endorsement.

Cramer said that he "customarily" avoided involvement in primaries outside of his own race, but Kirk claimed that Cramer assisted Eckerd and strongly criticized the governor.

Divided party

Though Carswell and Eckerd endorsed Cramer and Kirk, they were not active in the fall campaign. Unlike the Republicans, Democratic State Senators Lawton Chiles of Lakeland and Reubin Askew of Pensacola, had healed philosophical division within their own ranks. Republican Representative Louis Frey, Jr., of Winter Park, addressing the Republican state convention in Orlando implored the factions to unite for the general election.

Askew ran for governor and Chiles for US Senator. "Askew and Chiles form a logical team. Kirk and Cramer don't," said the Miami Herald, noting the "uneasy alliance" between the Republican nominees. In its endorsement of the Democrats, the Miami Herald said that Askew had "captured the imagination of a state that plainly deserves new leadership."

Kirk ridiculed his opponent Askew as "a momma's boy who wouldn't have the courage to stand up under the fire of the legislators" and a "nice sweet-looking fellow chosen by liberals ... to front for them." Such rhetoric helped to reinvigorate the Democratic coalition.

Cramer v. Chiles

In the general election campaign for the US Senate seat, Cramer questioned Democrat Lawton Chiles' votes in the state senate on several matters regarding insurance. One law increased automobile liability rates by 50 percent over two years, and another raised premiums for school bus insurance, at a time that Chiles' insurance agency in Lakeland held the policy on the Polk County School Board. Such "conflict-of-interest" issues seemed to have little political effect. The "self-made" Cramer depicted Chiles as coming from a "silver spoon" background (his net worth was $300,000, which adjusted to inflation would’ve made Chiles a millionaire in 2020), but the media did not address questions about the candidates' personal wealth.

Reporters focused on "Walkin' Lawton"'s 92-day, 1,000-mile trek from the Florida panhandle to Key Largo. Before the walk, termed a "public relations stroke of genius," Chiles had name recognition by only 5 percent of voters; afterward, he had gained widespread and often uncritical recognition. The Tallahassee Democrat forecast correctly that Chiles's "weary feet and comfortable hiking boots" would carry the 40-year-old "slow-country country lawyer" with "back-country common sense and methodical urbane political savvy" to victory over his opponent Bill Cramer.

Cramer could not match Chiles' public appeal. A Cramer aide said it was difficult "selling experience. It's not a sexy thing." With "shoe leather and a shoestring budget," Chiles presented himself as a "problem solver who doesn't automatically vote 'No' on every issue."

Cramer later said that he should have demanded more debates and rebuffed the walking tactic:

I never could get that turned around. He was walking, and I was running. But the press was enamored with the walk ... Every time he was asked a question about where he stood, he would quote somebody that he met on the campaign trail to state what he was to do when he got to the Senate consistent with what that constituent had said. The basic approach gave him more credibility to his walk, which had nothing to do with his qualifications for the Senate but gave him free publicity and appealed to the 'little man.'

With the environment a national concern by 1970, Chiles announced his opposition to the Cross Florida Barge Canal. This had originally been supported by every member of the Florida congressional delegation. The project, one-third completed, was cancelled early in 1971; the area is now a protected green belt corridor. Chiles endorsed federal funding to remove waste from Lake Apopka in central Florida, which was known for its bass fish. Cramer received little credit from environmentalists, although he had drafted the Water Pollution Control Act of 1956 and had sponsored legislation to protect alligators, stop beach erosion, dredge harbors, and remove oil spills. Instead, Cramer critics accused him of having weakened anti-pollution laws. Cramer questioned Chiles' opposition to a proposed severance tax on phosphate mining, which particularly affected Tampa Bay.

The issue of protecting the environment continued to attract more support in Florida. By 1974, a survey showed Floridians favored limits on development, and 60 percent urged more government funding for conservation initiatives.

In the 1970 Republican primary, all major papers in Florida except the pro-Carswell Tallahassee Democrat had supported Cramer's nomination, but in the general election against Chiles, Cramer was supported by only three publications—in Orlando, Fort Myers, and Pasco County. Cramer failed to pin the "liberal" label on Chiles. The New York Times observed that Chiles and Askew "convey amiable good ol' boy qualities with moderate-to-liberal aspirations that do not strike fear into the hearts of conservatives."

Chiles was also supported by the retiring Democratic Senator Spessard Holland.<ref>Cramer v. Kirk," p. 419</ref> Chiles said that Cramer could bring "Nixon, Agnew, Reagan, and anybody else he wants. [of top Republican officials] ... I'll take Holland on my side against all of them."

During the late 1960s, a period of protests against the Vietnam War and other social unrest, Cramer had introduced an anti-riot measure as an addition to the Civil Rights Act of 1968. It made police assault a federal crime and federalized as conspiracy those rioters who crossed state lines to commit riots. This passed the House by 389-25. The law was lauded at Cramer rallies by Vice President Agnew and United States Attorney General John N. Mitchell. Five of the 1968 Chicago Seven defendants were prosecuted under this law (all were acquitted), as was professor and activist Angela Davis in a separate arrest and trial in 1970.

Cramer said achieving a Republican-majority Senate could result in the removal of controversial Democratic Senator J. William Fulbright of Arkansas as the chairman of the Senate Foreign Relations Committee. He had long opposed the Vietnam War. In response, Chiles noted that if Republicans controlled the Senate, other southern Democrats would also forfeit committee chairmanships earned and long controlled through their seniority.

Nixon campaigning in Florida

In his presidential papers, Nixon, who campaigned for Cramer in Miami Beach, Palm Beach, St. Petersburg, and Tallahassee, cited the congressman's sponsorship of "significant legislation to stop bombing and riots" and his record on the environment, senior citizens, and education.

Nixon claimed that more Republicans were needed in Congress to bring an "honorable end" to the Vietnam War, to maintain America's international presence, and to halt "permissiveness, pornography, and busing." The Democratic congressional majorities, reaffirmed after the 1970 elections, soon prompted Nixon to claim an "ideological majority", or a bipartisan coalition of conservatives and moderates to pass his programs. Critical of dissenting youth, Nixon reminded the "silent majority" in St. Petersburg that "the impossible dream in most countries is possible in America."

Making the first presidential appearance in Tallahassee since William McKinley, Nixon plugged "neighborhood schools" and renounced busing for the "sole purpose of achieving racial balance" as contrary to law and "quality education." Though Chiles also opposed busing, he attracted African-American support by declaring Cramer's antibusing amendment as "just talk" and "an emotional issue." Cramer challenged Chiles' vote in the Florida Senate to give court-imposed busing orders "the status of state law." Chiles proposed magnet schools to negate busing conflicts.

Despite the Nixon-Agnew "road show," polls showed Chiles and Askew with pre-election leads larger than three-to-two. Cramer insisted that the polls reflected only the views of the media. The GOP was weakened when partisans of former governor George C. Wallace of Alabama, the 1968 American Independent Party nominee, endorsed Askew and Chiles. Kirk had earlier said that Wallace was "a racist" and a "flaming liberal" trying to thwart the emergence of the Republican Party in the South.The St. Petersburg Times'' found Kirk trailing Askew by 22 points in Pinellas County, while Cramer led Chiles in his home county by only seven points. The survey showed Kirk with 51 percent support from Republicans, compared to Cramer's 75 percent support from the party regulars.

1970 election results

Cramer polled 772,817 votes (46.1 percent), gaining crossover votes of 61,716 more ballots than the number of registered Republicans in Florida. Chiles' 902,438 tabulation (53.9 percent) was less than half of registered Democrats, but he gained majorities in 55 counties, compared to 13 counties tilting to Cramer. Most of the Democratic electorate sat out what political analysts thought was one of the most contested Senate general elections in Florida history. Robert Sikes speculated that some primary supporters of Farris Bryant may have defected to Cramer, and a number of Republicans may have sat out the election, too.

Democrat Askew won all but nine counties to defeat Kirk for the governorship, 984,305 to 746,243. Cramer polled 26,574 more votes than Kirk and carried five counties which Kirk lost: Broward, Collier, Martin, Pasco, and Pinellas. Cramer had 11,000 more votes than Chiles in Pinellas County, when Republicans outnumbered registered Democrats there by more than 3,000. Kirk and Cramer each won seven counties, Indian River, Lake, Manatee, Orange, Osceola, Sarasota, and Seminole. Kirk took two counties lost by Cramer, Clay and St. Johns.

Cramer, Edward Gurney, and Kirk differ on the reasons for their party's 1970 debacle. As a factor in his loss, Cramer cited his reliance on an out-of-state public relations firm not well versed in Florida politics. He has said that the $350,000 spending limit then in effect for elections did not permit sufficient television advertising. Cramer believed very much that the intraparty schism hurt his campaign.

But, in 1970 the GOP fared poorly across the South. The exception was Tennessee, where Republican U.S. Representative Bill Brock was elected to the U.S. Senate. Defeated Southern Republicans included U.S. Representatives Albert W. Watson, a Strom Thurmond ally seeking the governorship of South Carolina; and George Herbert Walker Bush, running a second time from Texas for the U.S. Senate but losing to Lloyd M. Bentsen. Meanwhile, Republican Governor Winthrop Rockefeller was unseated in Arkansas by Democrat Dale Bumpers.

Gurney blamed the 1970 defeat in Florida on the inability of the Republican nominees to attract cross-over Democratic support. Kirk said no Republican could have won statewide that year because Askew and Chiles had commanded the majority coalition in the state. The Democrats found that "fresh faces and new looks outweighed age and experience." They gained extensive support from working-class whites, blacks (who were voting in higher numbers), Jews (including retirees from the North), Cuban Americans, urban residents, and rural voters.

Later years

Two months after the general election, tensions between Cramer and Gurney resumed. L. E. "Tommy" Thomas, an automobile dealer from Panama City who was supported by Cramer, gained the Florida state Republican chairmanship, defeating the Gurney-endorsed Duke Crittenden of Orlando. Three congressmen friendly with Cramer, J. Herbert Burke of Hollywood, Louis Frey of Orlando, and Bill Young of St. Petersburg, and Paula Hawkins of Maitland, drafted a letter to President Nixon urging that Cramer, not Gurney, be the patronage advisor in Florida. Gurney quickly arranged a "peace" meeting with his intraparty rivals, and they never mailed the letter.

Gurney retired as senator in 1974. He later failed in an effort to regain his former House seat. He was charged and acquitted of taking $300,000 in kickbacks from federal housing contracts.

Cramer never again sought public office and declined to consider an appointment as a federal judge. Based on his long experience in Washington, DC, he opened a law practice (Cramer & Matthews) with offices in Washington, D.C. and Miami.  The Florida office was run by his partner, F. Lawrence Matthews.  Their offices were in the first high rise in downtown Miami (1 Biscayne Tower). In 1973, he and Matthews served as unpaid advisers to House Republican Leader Gerald R. Ford, Jr. of Michigan for confirmation as vice president following the resignation of Spiro T. Agnew from the Nixon administration. They appeared with Ford at the Senate confirmation hearings.  Cramer also aided in talks when President Ford decided to pardon previous president Richard M. Nixon after his resignation following the Watergate scandal. He continued on the Republican National Committee until 1984. Cramer lobbied Congress and the executive branch on behalf of several foreign governments, including that of President Anastasio Somoza of Nicaragua.

In 1979, Cramer was selected by the Ford administration to head the first trade mission to China after the normalization of relations. Cramer represented the Republican National Committee when the liberal Ripon Society unsuccessfully fought the delegate formula dating from 1972, when Cramer had been chair of the RNC Rules Committee.

In the fall of 1988, his former House colleague George H. W. Bush was elected as president, and Cramer returned to St. Petersburg. He established another law practice and became involved in real estate with his friend and former aide Jack Inscoe.

The Florida GOP made little headway during the 1970s. Republicans lost the Gurney Senate seat in 1974 but regained it in 1980. The party did not win the governorship until 1986, when the former Democrat Bob Martinez was elected as the state's first ever Hispanic chief executive. Martinez was unseated in 1990 by former U.S. Senator Lawton Chiles, who won the first of two consecutive terms as governor. By 1989, Florida Republican gained their first majority among members of the state's congressional delegation. The Florida GOP made gains in party registration during the 1980s, having majorities of registered party members in twelve counties. In October 1988, Republicans numbered 2,360,434, compared to 3,264,105 for the Democrats.

Fraternal and civic activities
Cramer was a member of Veterans of Foreign Wars, the St. Petersburg College Alumni Association Board of Directors, the American Legion, AMVETS, the Benevolent and Protective Order of Elks, the Order of the Eastern Star, the Moose International, and the Shriners. He was Methodist.

Death and legacy

Cramer died at the age of eighty-one in South Pasadena, Florida, from complications of a heart attack. He was survived by his second wife of eleven years, the former Sarah Ellen (née Bromelow) Hilber. He and his first wife Alice had three sons together before their divorce: William C. Cramer, Jr., who became an attorney and car dealer in Panama City; Mark C. Cramer, an attorney in Charlotte, North Carolina; and Allyn Walters Cramer, a car dealer in Dothan, Alabama (his mother's hometown); two stepsons, Richard D. Hilber of St. Petersburg and Jason E. Hilber of Odessa, Florida; and eight grandchildren. Cramer is interred at Woodlawn Memory Gardens in St. Petersburg.

The William C. Cramer Post Office in St. Petersburg is named in his honor.

Historian Billy Hathorn says that the Cramer-Kirk schism so damaged the growth of the Republican Party in the state that it took years to recover. He believes that the party lost an opportunity in the 1970 campaign, when it lost the governorship and a US Senate seat. But that year Democratic candidates swept the entire South, and it took years for the shift among conservative whites to the Republican Party to take place. After the 1970 schism, the Florida GOP were confronted by the continued success for years of noncontroversial Democrats considered to be "moderates." But since the late 20th century, more voters in Florida have shifted to register and vote Republican, supporting their candidates for statewide leadership.

References

External links
 

1922 births
2003 deaths
Politicians from Denver
Politicians from St. Petersburg, Florida
St. Petersburg College alumni
University of North Carolina at Chapel Hill alumni
Harvard Law School alumni
Florida lawyers
American lobbyists
American real estate businesspeople
Republican Party members of the Florida House of Representatives
Methodists from Florida
United States Navy officers
United States Navy personnel of World War II
Republican Party members of the United States House of Representatives from Florida
20th-century American politicians
St. Petersburg High School alumni
New Right (United States)